Capital's Summertime Ball is a mini-festival in London, held on either first or second Saturday or Sunday of June by the radio station Capital. The first ball was at Emirates Stadium in 2009, and it has since been held at Wembley Stadium. The 2020 Summertime Ball was to be held at the Tottenham Hotspur Stadium because Wembley was due to host games of Euro 2020, but was eventually cancelled due to the COVID-19 pandemic.

The event is promoted and broadcast by the Capital network. There have been five different sponsors since its first event. From 2012 until 2018, Vodafone UK was the sponsor. In 2009, Barclaycard sponsored the ball. In 2010 ASOS.com sponsored the event, with Starbucks sponsoring the event in 2011, Apple Music sponsoring the event in 2019 and Barclaycard once again sponsoring the event in 2022 since sponsoring the 2009 event.

2009

Kelly Clarkson, Leona Lewis and Akon were the headline acts for the first ever Summertime Ball. Blue and Katy Perry were the supporting headliners.

The event was hosted by Capital London presenters Rich Clarke, Kat Shoob, Lisa Snowdon and Johnny Vaughan. The show was sponsored by Barclaycard.

Lineup

2010

Summertime Ball this year took place on Sunday 6 June at Wembley Stadium. The backstage action ran from 10am to 4pm, while Summertime Ball 2010 itself started at 4pm and ended at 9:30pm. The concert was hosted by Capital Breakfast DJs Johnny Vaughan and Lisa Snowdon.

2011
The Summertime Ball 2011 was sponsored by Starbucks and took place on Sunday 12 June at Wembley in London. Jennifer Lopez was the headline act for this year's ball. Tickets for the event sold out on 3 June 2011. However, in the weeks running up to the Summertime Ball, Capital held on-air competitions to allow listeners to win tickets to the event.

Lineup 

The first Summertime Ball to be aired across the Capital network of radio stations was presented by James 'The Bassman' Bassam, Greg Burns and Rich Clarke. Roberto presented interactive content and Kat Shoob was a backstage reporter.

2012

The Summertime Ball 2012 was sponsored by Vodafone and took place at Wembley Stadium on Saturday 9 June 2012. Katy Perry and Coldplay were both headline acts for this year's ball, with Justin Bieber and Jessie J being supporting headline acts. The line-up for this year's event was announced on localised Capital Breakfast shows across the United Kingdom on 21 April 2012. This year the event features a brand new logo. Ticketmaster sold out in all categories.

Lineup

2013

The 2013 Summertime Ball was held on Saturday 8 June 2013 at Wembley Stadium. It was announced on 24 April 2013 that Justin Timberlake would be the guest presenter hosting the ball for 2013. Tickets went on sale on Friday 26 April at 8am, and sold out in under 2 hours. The 2013 Vodafone Summertime Ball featured the most acts ever for a single Capital FM ball with 21 performers. The headliners, Robbie Williams and Taylor Swift made their ball debuts on Saturday 8 June, with will.i.am, performing at his fourth ball, but his first one solo, and Olly Murs, who made his debut Summertime Ball performance, being the supporting headline acts. The Wanted's fourth appearance at this ball made them the most frequent performers at the Summertime Ball. Band member Nathan Sykes returned after having major throat surgery earlier on in the year, making this his first performance after his throat surgery. Justin Timberlake also performed at the event, despite only being listed as a host rather than a performer.

Lineup

2014
The 2014 Summertime Ball was officially announced by Capital FM on Monday 28 April 2014, and the announcement stated that ticket and venue details will be announced the following week. On 6 May, it was confirmed that the ball would return to Wembley for the fifth consecutive time and be held on Saturday 21 June. The first headliner, Miley Cyrus was announced on 7 May. The full line-up followed on 8 May, with Pharrell Williams and David Guetta as other headliners. Calvin Harris, Ed Sheeran, Little Mix and Enrique Iglesias were later revealed to be the supporting headliners of the mini-festival. Tickets officially went on sale the following day. Marvin Humes opened the show with an introductory DJ set.

Lineup

2015
The 2015 Summertime Ball returned to Wembley for the sixth consecutive time and was held on Saturday 6 June 2015. The show sold out within the second few hours of ticket shows. On 27 April 2015 One Direction announced they were going to be the first headliners for the show. LunchMoney Lewis was added to the lineup on 19 May, with Rixton and Nick Jonas being added the following day. Former The Wanted star Nathan Sykes joined the lineup on 22 May. After appearing at the ball four times together with The Wanted and joining Jessie J on stage at the Summertime Ball last year plus his awaited performance this year, it was Sykes' sixth consecutive appearance since 2010 making him the most performed act to date. Sam Smith was due to perform, but withdrew from the show due to illness. Kelly Clarkson performed bare foot at this ball.

Lineup

2016
The Summertime Ball returned to Wembley for the seventh consecutive year on Saturday 11 June 2016.

Little Mix and Tinie Tempah were the headliners for 2016.

Zayn Malik was due to perform at the event, but pulled out last minute due to nervous health issues and later apologized to fans. He has never performed a concert since.

Lineup

2017
The Capital Summertime Ball with Vodafone returned to Wembley Stadium on Saturday 10 June 2017 with the event being announced on Friday 28 April 2017 by Roman Kemp and Vick Hope via Capital Breakfast. They announced 7 acts per-day from Monday 7 May until Wednesday 9 May and the headlining act was announced on Thursday 10 May with tickets going on sale the same day and selling out in 30 minutes. Maroon 5 pulled out of the event and were replaced by Liam Payne and Sigala on Thursday 8 June. Bruno Mars and Little Mix headlined the event with Shawn Mendes and Niall Horan as supporting headliners.

Capital FM produced three programs dedicated to this event: on 10 June 2017, it broadcast live backstage from 6am to 3pm with Rob Howard, Will Cozens and Jimmy Hill, then live coverage from Wembley from 3pm to 11pm by three presenters in order: Ant Payne, Vick Hope and The Bassman, and finally JJ ran an "Afterparty" edition until 2am at night; on the next day, JJ reviewed every best moment from the event on his slot 7-10pm. After this, the network moved back to normal programming. Highlights of the event were aired on Capital TV from 7:00pm to 10:30pm on the day of the ball. This was the final performance of Dua Lipa and Sean Paul together with their song No Lie.

Lineup

2018

The Capital Summertime Ball returned to Wembley on Saturday 9 June 2018 and was announced by Roman Kemp and Vick Hope on Capital Breakfast on Friday 28 April. 5 acts were announced everyday from Monday 30 April 2018 until 3 May 2018. Tickets went on sale on Thursday 3 May 2018 and sold out in 5 days. Shawn Mendes and Camila Cabello headlined the event, with Rita Ora and Charlie Puth as supporting headliners. Marvin Humes did a DJ set from 2:40pm before the main show began at 3pm.

Lineup

2019 
The 2019 Summertime Ball was held on Saturday, 8 June 2019 at Wembley for the 10th consecutive year. The lineup was announced on Capital Breakfast with Roman Kemp, Vick Hope and Sonny Jay from Monday, 29 April 2019. The lineup was announced by being revealed on billboards across the United Kingdom. The person who spotted the 'Ballboards' had to text 83958 with their location and the artist they saw and as a result of confirming an artist Kemp would give the caller a pair of tickets to this year's event.

The headliner was announced to be Calvin Harris on 2 May 2019. Marvin Humes did an Introductory DJ Set at 2:00pm, with the show starting at 2:30pm BST and finishing at approximately 10pm BST. Roman Kemp, Vick Hope and Sonny Jay hosted the Ball. Tickets sold out six days after they went on sale.

There was also a livestream on the Capital FM website, the Global Player app and on Capital's channel on Apple News which started at 2:30pm BST hosted by Vick Hope, Jimmy Hill and Marvin Humes (as Backstage Reporter). The livestream was also available to watch on Capital's TikTok page hosted by HRVY. Highlights & vlogs of the 2019 Summertime Ball were uploaded to Capital's and other people's YouTube channels from Sunday 9 June 2019. There were also Ball updates on Capital's Instagram, Twitter and Facebook pages.

Lineup

2020 

The 2020 Summertime Ball was due to be hosted on Saturday 6 June 2020 at Tottenham Hotspur Stadium. However, on 19 March 2020, Capital announced that it had cancelled the Ball due to the ongoing COVID-19 pandemic and Government issued advice surrounding the event. The ball was due to return in 2021. On 6 May 2020, Capital announced a replacement event called The Best of the Capital Summertime Ball. The two-hour special showcased highlights from the previous decade and was shown on Sky One, Capital FM, YouTube and Global Player from 5:00pm BST on 16 May.

2021 

Summertime Ball never took place this year due to the COVID-19 pandemic. However, in its place, "Capital Up Close With Barclaycard" took place at London's Under The Bridge venue. The only way in was to win tickets by listening to Capital FM for a chance of winning tickets to the gig.

28 July-Anne-Marie
12 August- Mabel
27 August- Capital Weekender Live featuring MistaJam, Jodie Harsh, 220 Kid and Billen Ted
31 August- Years & Years

2022 
This was the first Summertime Ball in three years. It took place on Sunday, 12 June at Wembley Stadium.

There was a Kick-off party to help advertise the event, on 27 April 2022 at Global Studios in Leicester Square. The Party was hosted by Roman Kemp, Siân Welby and Sonny Jay. The DJs were MistaJam, Jax Jones and Marvin Humes.

It was announced that Ed Sheeran would open 2022 Summertime Ball at 2pm BST, due to having a later concert as part of his +–=÷x Tour at the Etihad Stadium in Manchester, on the same day, and that David Guetta would close the Ball at approximately 9:30pm BST. it was also announced that, Maisie Peters, Sam Ryder and Nathan Dawe were added to the line-up. MistaJam opened the ball with an Introductory DJ set.

Line-up

See also 
 Global Radio
 Jingle Bell Ball

References

External links
 

Capital (radio network)
Music festivals in London
Concerts at Wembley Stadium